is a Japanese voice actor who is affiliated with the Osaka TV Talent Bureau (TTB) and a graduate of the Amusement Media Academy. He trained to be a chef until he was spotted by SNK for his voice.

Voice roles

Anime
 The King of Fighters: Another Day (2006) – Ash Crimson (episode 4)

Video games
 SNK vs. Capcom: SVC Chaos (2003) – Balrog
 The King of Fighters 2003 (2003) – Ash Crimson
 The King of Fighters XI (2005) – Ash Crimson
 Doki Doki Akazukin (2007) – Mitchie
 The King of Fighters XII (2009) – Ash Crimson
 The King of Fighters XIII (2010) – Ash Crimson, Saiki, Evil Ash, Hwa Jai
 The King of Fighters All Star (2019–20) – Ash Crimson, Saiki
 The King of Fighters XV (2022) – Ash Crimson

References

External links
Osaka TV Talent Bureau profile
Sōnosuke Nagashiro's personal blog

Living people
Japanese male video game actors
Japanese male voice actors
21st-century Japanese male actors
Year of birth missing (living people)